The Scinde Railway  was one of the pioneering railway companies that operated in Sind during the British Raj between 1855 and 1885.

History
The Scinde Railway was first established by deed of settlement in March 1855 and incorporated by the ‘Scinde Railway Act’ of Parliament in July 1855. The company contracted with the government to construct a line between Karachi and Kotri. The company was granted a 5% return on investment up to a maximum of £1 million in order to build the 120-mile line. The Karachi-Kotri Railway Line work commenced in April 1858 and on 13 May 1861 succeeded in connecting Karachi to Kotri. This was the first railway line for public use between Karachi and Kotri, a distance of 108 miles (174 km). The company was involved in a number of additional railway line projects, as well as the establishment of the Indus Steam Flotilla along the Indus River and Chenab River. The ‘Scinde Railway Act'  of 1857  granted it the opportunity to extend its operations. In 1870, the Scinde Railway Company was amalgamated with the Punjab Railway and Delhi Railway companies and renamed as the Scinde, Punjab & Delhi Railway company. This was covered by the ‘Scinde Railway Company's Amalgamation Act‘ of 1869.

Rolling stock
By the end of 1864 the company owned 31 steam locomotives, 66 coaches and 617 goods wagons.

Personnel
John Brunton: (1857), appointed chief resident engineer of Scinde Railway, (1858–62) supervised the construction of the 108 miles (174 kilometers) Scinde Railway line between Karachi and Kotri until its completion in 1862. His detailed "Description of the line and works of the Scinde Railway" itemise the problems of building the line.
William Arthur Brunton, (son of John Brunton): (1857) at age 17, assistant engineer and later area surveyor on the Scinde Railway and Indus Valley State Railway, (1859-1961) responsible for the erection of the thirty-two 45 foot (13.7 meter) span of Bahrun Valley Viaduct. This is the longest bridge on the Karachi-Kotri section and is a viaduct across the Bahrun River. Construction on this bridge was started on 5 March 1859 and completed on 26 January 1861.
Willoughby Charles Furnivall: (c.1860-70), district engineer in charge of construction under John Brunton

See also 
 History of rail transport in Pakistan
 Pakistan Railways
 Punjab Railway
 Scinde, Punjab & Delhi Railway

References

External links
"Karachi to Kotri: The First Railways in Pakistan". 17/09/2009.  All things Pakistan, now an archived website
"The Scinde railway, and its relations to the Euphrates valley, and other routes to India" by W P Andrews, Chairman of the Scinde Railway Company 1856 Google Books
"Report of proceedings of an extraordinary general meeting of the Scinde Railway Company, held on Friday the 24th July, 1857" Google Books
Brunton, John, "Description of the Line and Works of the Scinde Railway". 1863. Available in  Full View Google Books or pdf from Panhwar.com
  "British Library Archives and Manuscripts Catalogue"  - Search;  Retrieved   8 Apr 2016

Transport in Karachi
Transport in Multan
Defunct railway companies of Pakistan
Railway companies established in 1855
Indian companies established in 1855